Fenox Venture Capital is an American venture capital firm, headquartered in San Jose, California.

Description

Fenox Venture Capital was founded by Vitaliy Arbuzov and Anis Uzzaman in 2009. 
Fenox VC works with emerging technology companies worldwide and has been serving as a bridge for global startups seeking entry into American, Asian, European and Middle Eastern markets.

Investments 
In December 2015, Fenox led a $16 million investment in Jibo. This investment was seen as a push from Jibo to start expanding globally. In February 2016, the firm led an investment in agriculture IoT company Edyn. The investment in Edyn was another event in Fenox establishing itself as a key investor and supporter of American technology startups aspiring to grow globally.

In May 2016, the firm led a $14 million investment in Affectiva. Other portfolio companies include Tech in Asia, BlockCypher, MindMeld, and Sensely.

Controversies 
In February 2016, it was reported that Fenox was ordered by the US Department of Labor to pay back wages totaling over $330,000 to 56 unpaid interns it had hired.

In June 2017, Uzzaman and Fenox sued an anonymous blogger saying he falsely accused him of sexual harassment. The lawsuit was later dismissed. 

During the course of the proceeding, a court order discovered the IP address tracing to the article was linked to the home address of Brandon Katayama Hill, founder and CEO of a San Francisco based company Btrax. The case was finally settled with a multimillion dollar payment by the defense.

References

Financial services companies established in 2011
Venture capital firms of the United States